Aluminium granules are fine spherical aggregates of aluminium.

Manufacture
Aluminium granules are manufactured by the melting of primary or secondary aluminium and blown in air or vacuum, or are cast in sand and then sieved off. Other methods include casting of molten aluminium in water.

Granules versus powders 
Aluminium granules have been found safer and economical compared to atomized aluminium powder. Aluminium granules have lower explosion risk in production and in use of the product itself.

Advantages
The density of aluminium granules ranges from 1.0 to 1.8 g/cm3 and is much higher compared to aluminium powder.

See also

 Aluminium powder

References

Aluminium alloys
Deoxidizers